La Combe-de-Lancey is a commune in the Isère department in Auvergne-Rhône-Alpes region in southeastern France. The municipality covers an area of over 1,800 hectares. Located in the heart of the Belledonne, the town is bordered by Revel, Saint-Jean-le-Vieux, and Saint-Mury-Monteymond.

Population

See also
Communes of the Isère department

References

Combedelancey
Isère communes articles needing translation from French Wikipedia